In mathematical invariant theory, a transvectant is an invariant formed from n invariants in n variables using Cayley's Ω process.

Definition
If Q1,...,Qn are functions of n variables x = (x1,...,xn) and r ≥ 0  is an integer then the rth transvectant of these functions is a function of n variables given by

where Ω is Cayley's Ω process, the tensor product means take a product of functions with different variables x1,..., xn, and tr means set all the vectors xk equal.

Examples
The zeroth transvectant is the product of the n functions.

The first transvectant is the Jacobian determinant of the n functions.

The second transvectant is a constant times the completely polarized form of the Hessian of the n functions.

Footnotes

References
 
 

Invariant theory